The 2022–23 Scottish Challenge Cup known as the SPFL Trust Trophy due to sponsorship reasons, is the 31st season of the competition. The total number of participating clubs is 53, up from 50, with the return of clubs from Wales and Northern Ireland. The competition began on 9 August 2022 with the first round and will end on 25 or 26 March 2023 with the final at a yet to be chosen neutral venue.

Thirty teams from the Championship, League One and League Two compete, along with four teams from the Highland Football League and four from the Lowland Football League. In addition to this, Under-21 teams from 11 of the 12 clubs competing in the Scottish Premiership are represented. This season also sees the return of guest clubs, with two sides each coming from Northern Ireland's NIFL Premiership and Wales' Cymru Premier respectively.

Format

First round
The first round featured 3 clubs from 2021–22 Scottish League Two, 4 clubs from the 2021–22 Scottish Highland Football League, 4 clubs from the 2021–22 Scottish Lowland Football League and 11 of the 12 under-21 teams of the 2022–23 Scottish Premiership, with Ross County not entering an under-21 team.

The draw was made on 4 July 2022 at 13:00 and broadcast live on the SPFL YouTube Channel. The draw was regionalised and all non-Under 21 teams were seeded. The matches were played on 9 and 10 August 2022.

North Section

Draw
Teams that entered the competition in the first round.

Teams in bold advanced to the second round.

Matches

South Section

Draw
Teams that entered the competition in the first round.

Teams in bold advanced to the second round.

Matches

Note

Second round
The second round featured the 11 winners from the previous round, along with 2 clubs from 2021–22 Scottish League One and 7 clubs from 2021–22 Scottish League Two.

The draw for the second round was also made on 4 July 2022 at 13:00 on the live broadcast from the SPFL YouTube Channel. The draw was regionalised, but not seeded. The matches were played on 23 and 24 August 2022.

North Section

Draw
Teams that entered the competition in the second round.

Matches

South Section

Draw
Teams that entered the competition in the second round.

Matches

Third round
The third round featured the 10 winners from the previous round, along with all 10 clubs from 2022–23 Scottish Championship, 8 clubs from 2021–22 Scottish League One, 2 clubs from 2021–22 NIFL Premiership and 2 clubs from 2021–22 Cymru Premier.

The draw was made on 29 August 2022 at 13:00 and broadcast live on the SPFL YouTube Channel. This draw was not regionalised or seeded, but cross-border clubs were kept apart for this round. The matches were played between 22 September and 15 November 2022.

Draw
Teams that enter the competition in the third round.

Matches

Fourth round
No new teams entered in this round.

The draw was made on 4 October 2022 at 13:00 and was broadcast live on the SPFL YouTube Channel. The matches were played on 8, 9 and 10 December 2022.

Teams in Bold advanced to the quarter-finals.

Matches

Quarter-finals
The draw was made on 13 December 2022 at 13:00 along with the semi-final draw live on the SPFL YouTube channel. The matches were played on 10, 11 and 24 January 2023.

Teams in Bold advanced to the semi-finals.

Matches

Semi-finals

Matches

Final

References

Scottish Challenge Cup seasons
Challenge Cup
Challenge Cup